Lithocarpus platycarpus is a species of plant in the family Fagaceae. It is a tree endemic to Java in Indonesia. It is an endangered species threatened by habitat loss..

References

platycarpus
Endemic flora of Java
Endangered flora of Asia
Taxonomy articles created by Polbot